This page explains commonly used terms related to knots.

B

Bend 

A bend is a knot used to join two lengths of rope.

Bight 

A bight has two meanings in knotting.  It can mean either any central part of a rope (between the standing end and the working end) or an arc in a rope that is at least as wide as a semicircle.  In either case, a bight is a length of rope that does not cross itself.  Knots that can be tied without use of the working end are called knots on the bight.

Binding knot 

Binding knots are knots that either constrict a single object or hold two objects snugly together.  Whippings, seizings and lashings serve a similar purpose to binding knots, but contain too many wraps to be properly called a knot.  In binding knots, the ends of rope are either joined together or tucked under the turns of the knot.

Bitter end 
Another term for the working end.

C

Capsizing 

A knot that has capsized or spilled has deformed into a different structure.  Although capsizing is sometimes the result of incorrect tying or misuse, it can also be done purposefully in certain cases to strengthen the knot (see the carrick bend) or to untie a seized knot which would otherwise be difficult to release (see reef knot).

Chirality 

Chirality is the 'handedness' of a knot.  Topologically speaking, a knot and its mirror image may or may not have knot equivalence.

D

Decorative knot 

A decorative knot is any aesthetically pleasing knot.  Although it is not necessarily the case, most decorative knots also have practical applications or were derived from other well-known knots.  Decorative knotting is one of the oldest and most widely distributed folk art.

Dressing 
Knot dressing is the process of arranging a knot in such a way as to improve its performance.  Crossing or uncrossing the rope in a specific way, depending on the knot, can increase the knot's strength as well as reduce its jamming potential.

E

Elbow 
An elbow refers to any two nearby crossings of a rope.  An elbow is created when an additional twist is made in a loop.

Eye 
The 'eye' is in fact what is often (in error) referred to as a 'loop'.
The 'eye' functions in the same way as an 'eye bolt' or an 'eye splice'. The 'eye' provides a means to form connections. Note that the 'eye of a knot (or a splice) is fixed and does not slip. If it slipped, it would not function as an eye - it would act like a 'noose'.

F

Flake 
A flake refers to any number of turns in a coiled rope.  Likewise, to flake a rope means to coil it.

"Flaking" or "Faking" also means to lay a rope on a surface ready to use or to run out quickly without tangles

Fraps 
Fraps or "frapping turns" are a set of loops coiled perpendicularly around the wraps of a lashing as a means of tightening.

Friction hitch 

A friction hitch is a knot that attaches one rope to another in a way that allows the knot's position to easily be adjusted.  Sometimes friction hitches are called slide-and-grip knots.  They are often used in climbing applications.

H

Hitch 

A hitch is a knot that attaches a rope to some object, often a ring, rail, spar, post, or perhaps another rope, as in the case of the rolling hitch.

J

Jamming 

A jamming knot is any knot that becomes very difficult to untie after use.  Knots that are resistant to jamming are called non-jamming knots.

L

Lashing 

A lashing is an arrangement of rope used to secure two or more items together in a rigid manner.  Common uses include the joining of scaffolding poles and the securing of sailing masts.  The square lashing, diagonal lashing, and shear lashing are well-known lashings used to bind poles perpendicularly, diagonally, and in parallel, respectively.

Loop 

In reference to knots, loop may refer to:

 One of the fundamental structures used to tie knots. Specifically, it is a U-form narrower than a bight.
 A type of knot used to create a closed circle in a line.

A loop is one of the fundamental structures used to tie knots.  It is a full circle formed by passing the working end of a rope over itself.  When the legs of a closed loop are crossed to form a loop, the rope has taken a turn.

Loop knot 

A loop knot is a type of knot that has a fixed 'eye'.  The eye can be formed via 'tying-in-the-bight' (TIB) or by non-TIB methods. An example is the Figure 8 eye knot (ABoK #1047) - which can be tied-in-the-bight to directly form the eye in a 1 stage tying process. However, when attempting to attach the F8 eye knot to a climbing harness or to a tree, the TIB method will not work. Instead, the knot must be tied in a 2 stage tying process by first tying a figure 8 knot (ABoK #570) and then re-threading the tail through and around the #570 F8 knot to re-create the final F8 eye knot (#1047).  Unlike a hitch, a loop knot creates a fixed eye in a rope that maintains its structure regardless of whether or not it is fastened to an object.  In other words, the 'eye' can be removed from an object without losing its shape.

When visualizing the 'eye' of a knot - think in terms of an 'eye bolt' or an 'eye splice'. An eye bolt is not a loop bolt - it is properly referred to as an eye bolt. The same concept applies to an eye splice.

N

Noose 

A noose can refer to any sliding loop in which the loop tightens when pulled.

O

Open loop 
An open loop is a curve in a rope that resembles a semicircle in which the legs are not touching or crossed.  The legs of an open loop are brought together narrower than they are in a bight.

S

Seizing 

A seizing is a knot that binds two pieces of rope together side by side, normally in order to create a loop.  The structure of seizings is similar to that of lashings.

Setting 
Setting a knot is the process of tightening it.  Improper setting can cause certain knots to underperform.

Slipped knot 
 
A slipped knot is any knot that unties when an end is pulled.  Thus, tying the slipped form of a knot makes it easier to untie, especially when the knot is prone to jamming.

Small-stuff 

Small-stuff is a nautical and knot-tying term for thin string or twine, as opposed to the thick, heavy ropes that are more often used in sailing.  It is commonly used in a whipping to bind the ends of ropes to prevent fraying.

Historically, the term referred to cordage less than one inch in circumference.  Much of the small-stuff on board ships, especially that used for decorative or fancy ropework, was made by the sailors themselves reusing materials unlaid from old and leftover pieces of larger rope and cable.

Spilling

Splice 

Splicing is a method of joining two ropes done by untwisting and then re-weaving the rope's strands.

Standing end 
The standing end (or standing part) of a rope is the part that is not active in knot tying.  It is the opposite part in the working end.

Stopper knot 
A stopper knot is the type of knot tied to prevent a rope from slipping through a grommet.  The overhand knot is the simplest single-strand stopper knot.

T

Turn

A turn is one round of rope on a pin or cleat, or one round of a coil.

W

Whipping 

A whipping is a binding knot tied around the end of a rope to prevent the rope from unraveling.

Working end 
The working end (or working part) of a rope is the part active in knot tying.  It is the part opposite of the standing end.

See also 
 List of knots

References 

K